RIP Medical Debt is a Long Island City–based 501(c)(3) charity focused on the elimination of personal medical debt. Founded in 2014 by former debt collection executives Jerry Ashton and Craig Antico, the charity purchases medical debt on the debt collection market, and then forgives the debt. The charity converts every dollar contributed into $100 of purchased medical debt relief. The founders were inspired by medical debt elimination efforts by Occupy Wall Street. The charity gained attention in 2016 when the TV show Last Week Tonight with John Oliver used them to turn $60,000 into $15 million of debt forgiveness. As of June 2022, the charity has forgiven debts for over 2,800,000 individuals and families, totaling over $5 billion.

In January 2020, professional basketball player Trae Young of the Atlanta Hawks donated $10,000 to the non-profit to abolish a total of $1,000,000 in medical debt.

In December 2020, MacKenzie Scott, former wife of Amazon founder Jeff Bezos, donated $50 million.

References

External links
 
 RIP Medical Debt at GuideStar
 RIP Medical Debt at Charity Navigator
Organizations established in 2014
Long Island City
Non-profit organizations based in New York (state)
Debt buyers
Healthcare in the United States